The 1998 Italian Open was a tennis tournament played on outdoor clay courts. It was the 57th edition of the Rome Masters and was part of the Super 9 of the 1998 ATP Tour and of Tier I of the 1998 WTA Tour. Both the men's and women's events took place at the Foro Italico in Rome in Italy. The women's tournament was played from 4 to 10 May 1998; the men's tournament was played from 11 to 17 May 1998.

Finals

Men's singles

 Marcelo Ríos defeated  Albert Costa by walkover.
 It was Ríos' 4th title of the year and the 10th of his career. It was his 3rd Super 9 title and his 4th overall.

Women's singles

 Martina Hingis defeated  Venus Williams, 6–3, 2–6, 6–3.
 It was Hingis' 8th title of the year and the 18th of her career. It was her 2nd Tier I title of the year and her 5th overall.

Men's doubles

 Mahesh Bhupathi /  Leander Paes defeated  Ellis Ferreira /  Rick Leach, 6–4, 4–6, 7–6.
 It was Bhupathi's 4th title of the year and the 10th of his career. It was Paes' 4th title of the year and the 10th of his career.

Women's doubles

 Virginia Ruano Pascual /  Paola Suárez defeated  Amanda Coetzer /  Arantxa Sánchez-Vicario, 7–6(7–1), 6–4.
 It was Ruano Pascual's 4th title of the year and the 5th of her career. It was Suárez's 5th title of the year and the 6th of her career.

References

 
Italian Open
Italian Open
Italian Open
Italian Open (tennis)